This is an incomplete list of atonal musical compositions. Pieces are listed by composer.

B
Béla Bartók
Eight Improvisations on Hungarian Peasant Songs, Op. 20
Three Etudes for Piano, Op. 18
First Sonata for Violin and Piano (1921)
Second Sonata for Violin and Piano (1922)
John J. Becker
Symphonia brevis (1929)
Concerto arabesque (1930)
Alban Berg
Lulu
Wozzeck
Chamber Concerto (1925)
Johanna Beyer
Clusters (1936)
Chester Biscardi
At the Still Point (1977)
Henry Brant
Ghost Nets (1988)<ref>Reed, Peter Hugh (1991). American Record Guide, vol, 54, issue 2; vol. 54, issues 4-6, p. 41.</ref>

C
 John Cage
Julián Carrillo
Symphony No. 3 (1940)
Elliott Carter
String Quartet No. 1 (1950)
Ruth Crawford Seeger
Nine preludes for piano (1925–28)Piano Study in Mixed Accents (1930)

D
Mario Davidovsky
String Quartet No. 1 (1954)Concertino for Percussion and String Orchestra (1954)Noneto (1956)

E
Duke EllingtonThe Clothed Woman (1947)

F
Vivian FineFour Polyphonic Pieces for Piano (1931)Four Songs (1933)
Lukas FossTime Cycle (1960)Echoi (1963)
Toby FoxBergentrückung/ASGORE (2015)

G
Miriam GideonThe Hound of Heaven (1945)
String Quartet (1946)Symfonia Brevis (1953)Mixco (1957)Of Shadows Numberless (1966)

K
Leon Kirchner
Piano Trio No. 1 (1954)
String Quartet No. 3 (1966)Lily (1977)Music for Twelve (1985)Music for Cello and Orchestra (1992)
Ernst Krenek
Symphony No. 2 (1922)

L
Franz Liszt
Bagatelle sans tonalité (1885), S.216a

M
Nicholas MawEssay (1961)Scenes and Arias (1962)

P
Zoltan Paulinyi
 LUME 1 + 2 for solo viola pomposa and 2 orchestras (2018) Biblioteca (alias Library): chamber opera (2011) Preço do Perdão: chamber opera (2012)Henri PousseurExercices (1956)
 Krzysztof Penderecki
 Emanationem Partita per harpsichordR
Dane RudhyarPentagrams Nos. 1-4 (1924–26)
Three Paeans (1925–27)
Granites (1929)
Carl Ruggles
Angels (1921)
Vox clamans in deserto (1923)
Portals (1926)
Sun-Treader (1933)

S
Arnold Schoenberg
George Lieder [The Book of the Hanging Gardens] (1909), Op. 15/1
Erwartung (1909), Op. 17
String Quartet No. 2 (1907), Op. 10, last movement
Five Pieces for Orchestra (Fünf Orchesterstücke) (1909), Op. 16
Pierrot lunaire (1912), Op. 21
Drei Klavierstücke (1909), Op. 11
Four Orchestral Songs (1916), Op. 22
Die glückliche Hand, Op. 18
Herzgewächse (1911), Op. 20
Die Jakobsleiter
Sechs kleine Klavierstücke (1913), Op. 19
Five Pieces for Piano, Op. 23
Igor Stravinsky
The Rite of Spring (1913)

T
Louise Talma
Thirteen Ways of Looking at a Blackbird (1979)
The Ambient Air (1981)
Full Circle (1985)

V
Edgard Varèse
Density 21.5 (1936)
Offrandes (1922)
Intégrales (1925)
Arcana (1927)
Déserts (1954)

W
Anton Webern
Five Movements (1909), Op. 5
Six Pieces (1910), Op. 6
Six Bagatelles (1913), Op. 9
Stefan Wolpe
Enactments (1953)
Symphony (1956)

Other composers
Other composers with atonal pieces include Harrison Birtwistle & Peter Maxwell Davies, Jacob Druckman, Barbara Kolb, Henry Cowell, Claude Debussy, Brian Ferneyhough, Alexander Goehr, Lou Harrison, Mårten Hagström, Paul Hindemith, Karel Husa, Charles Ives, György Ligeti, Witold Lutosławski, George Perle, Sergei Prokofiev, David Raksin, Nikolai Roslavets, Hermann Schroeder, Alexander Scriabin, Charles Seeger, Igor Stravinsky, Fartein Valen, Tyshawn Sorey, and Iannis Xenakis.

See also
List of dodecaphonic and serial compositions
List of music students by teacher
List of tone rows and series

References

Atonal compositions
Atonal compositions
Post-tonal music theory